The Sustainable Forestry Initiative (SFI) is a sustainability organization operating in the U.S. and Canada that works across four pillars: standards, conservation, community, and education. SFI has two youth education initiatives: Project Learning Tree and Project Learning Tree Canada. SFI is the world's largest single forest certification standard by area. SFI is headquartered in Ottawa and Washington, D.C.

In 2005, the Programme for the Endorsement of Forest Certification, which itself is the world's largest forest certification system, recognized the SFI standard.

SFI standards
The SFI 2022 Forest Management Standard covers key values such as protection of biodiversity, species at risk and wildlife habitat; sustainable harvest levels; protection of water quality; and prompt regeneration. SFI has certified more than 370 million acres (150 million hectares) to its standard in the United States and Canada.

The SFI 2022 Fiber Sourcing Standard promotes responsible forestry practices based on 13 Principles, 11 Objectives, 29 Performance Measures and 59 Indicators that address the 90 percent of the world's forests that are not certified. The SFI 2022 Fiber Sourcing Standard distinguishes SFI from all other forest certification programs in that it sets mandatory practice requirements for the responsible procurement of all fiber, even if it is sourced from non-certified land. These fiber sourcing requirements include measures to broaden the practice of biodiversity, use best management practices to protect water quality, and utilize the services of forest management and harvesting professionals. Because it governs how SFI-certified organizations procure fiber from non-certified land, supporters argue that the standard encourages the spread of responsible forestry practices.

SFI 2022 Chain-of-custody standard is an accounting system that tracks forest fiber content (certified forest content, certified sourcing and recycled content) through production and manufacturing to the end product.

All SFI certifications require independent, third-party audits and are performed by internationally accredited certification bodies.

The new set of SFI 2022 Standards and Rules, developed through an open review process, took effect on Jan. 1, 2022. The SFI 2022 Standards and Rules include new requirements in a number of areas. The SFI Climate Smart Forestry Objective requires SFI-certified organizations to ensure forest management activities address climate change adaptation and mitigation measures. The SFI Fire Resilience and Awareness Objective requires SFI-certified organizations to limit susceptibility of forests to undesirable impacts of wildfire and to raise community awareness of fire benefits, risks, and minimization measures. The new Objective 8, Recognize and Respect Indigenous Peoples’ Rights, ensures respect for Indigenous Peoples’ rights and traditional knowledge, and are aligned with the principles of the United Nations Declaration on the Rights of Indigenous Peoples.

The SFI standards are revised and updated regularly to incorporate the latest scientific information and to ensure continual improvement. Draft SFI standards were publicly available throughout the revision process on the SFI website. Input was received during 10 public webinars. SFI gathered input from more than 2,300 stakeholders from the conservation community, Indigenous communities, the forest products sector, brand owners, private forest landowners and public forest managers, government agencies, trade associations, landowner associations, academia, and the public.

Independent oversight was provided at each stage of the revision process by the SFI External Review Panel, a group of independent experts representing conservation, professional, academic and public organizations, operating at arm's length from SFI. The SFI External Review Panel reviewed every public comment submitted to ensure that all comments were considered, and to guarantee the Standard revision process was transparent, objective and credible. The responses to comments are posted on the SFI website.

SFI standards only apply to forestlands in the United States and Canada, and SFI-certified organizations must comply with all applicable laws. For sources outside of North America without effective laws, participants must avoid illegal or other controversial sources. SFI supports activities by international experts to find ways to address the problem of illegal logging and is a member of the international, multi-stakeholder Forest Legality Alliance.

SFI sponsored a world record attempt for tree planting. During this attempt in May 2015, 29 teams came together to plant 202,935 trees in one hour across North America. The teams included youth, community groups and industry partners.

SFI Board of Directors
The Board of Directors that governs SFI has three chambers that recognize economic, environmental and social sectors equally. Directors include representatives of environmental, conservation, professional and academic groups, independent professional loggers, family forest owners, public officials, labor and the forest products industry.

Research publications
“In hopes of avoiding legal gridlock, federal and state agencies responsible for designing, financing, and conducting wildfire risk reduction thinning projects need to be thoroughly transparent and appropriately participatory with respect to parties of interest. These forestry agencies should consider the active involvement and third-party oversight of the two leading forest management certification programs active in the US: the Sustainable Forestry Initiative (SFI) and the Forest Stewardship Council (FSC).” This article in the July 2022 edition of The Forestry Source, from the Society of American Foresters, highlights the role of forest certification in combatting deforestation due to climate change. 

“Using technology to improve the management of development impacts on biodiversity,” published in the journal Business Strategy and the Environment, co-authored by Leo Viana, SFI’s Senior Director of Conservation Impact. The paper discusses how synergies between business and technology offer the opportunity for improved outcomes for biodiversity conservation via the use of existing and emerging technologies.

“Influence of mechanized timber harvesting on soil compaction in northern hardwood forests,” published in the journal Forest, Range and Wildland Soils, by Joshua Puhlick and Ivan Fernandez. The paper describes a project that evaluated and refined methods for minimizing soil compaction during harvesting operations. Soil compaction can have negative effects on a forest’s ability to regrow after harvesting, and this work helps inform best management practices to help minimize this issue and improve management of forests certified to the SFI Forest Management Standard. This project was supported by an SFI Conservation Grant to the University of Maine.

“Non-Native Earthworms Invade Forest Soils in Northern Maine, USA,” was published in the journal Forests by Joshua Puhlick, Ivan Fernandez, and Jay Wason. This brief communication documents the presence of non-native earthworms which have the potential to abruptly change soil properties and deplete or redistribute soil carbon stocks. In Northern Maine where the study took place, winters were previously thought to be too harsh for earthworm populations to survive. Thanks to this work, scientists and practitioners are now aware of their presence and can begin to consider ways to reduce those effects. This project was supported by an SFI Conservation Grant to the University of Maine.

Media references
“4 Ways the Inflation Reduction Act Invests in Healthier Forests and Greener Cities,” Popular Science magazine. This article focuses on the forestry provisions of the Inflation Reduction Act (IRA). Nadine Block, SFI's Senior Vice President of Community and Government Relations, is quoted praising the passage of the bill and the ways it advances climate-smart forestry activities that promote forest health and resilience. Block also cites the need to provide private landowners with resources to manage their forests with the best-available climate-smart practices. 

“At Issue is Deforestation Right Here in River City,” The Forestry Source, from the Society of American Foresters. Dr. Robert J. Hrubes writes about the challenge of mitigating wildfires. He calls on federal and state agencies to “…consider the active involvement and third-party oversight of the two leading forest management certification programs active in the US: the Sustainable Forestry Initiative (SFI) and the Forest Stewardship Council (FSC).”

“Outdoor classrooms reenergize kids during the pandemic,” CNN. This cable news story featured educators using educational materials from Project Learning Tree, SFI’s environmental education program.

“Opaskwayak Cree Nation student plans virtual ice fishing derby,” CBC. This news story featured Project Learning Tree Canada’s Green Leaders program, which encourages Indigenous youth to plan and deliver community-based projects. PLT Canada is supported in part by the Government of Canada and is delivered by the SFI and Canadian Parks Council networks.

“Forging a Career Path in the Forest Sector,” Alternatives Journal, Canada’s oldest environmental studies magazine.

“Help Protect North American Wildlife With Bird-Friendly Construction Design,” Construction Executive. SFI and the American Bird Conservancy collaborated on this an op-ed to highlight the importance of their collaborative efforts to allow SFI-certified organizations to access the latest information on bird habitat and conservation needs, which can be used to improve sustainable forest management.

Reviews and comparisons

Third-party reviews 

The United Nations Economic Commission for Europe/Food and Agriculture Organization, in its 2009–2010 Forest products Annual Review, says: "Over the years, many of the issues that previously divided the (certification) systems have become much less distinct. The largest certification systems now generally have the same structural programmatic requirements."

Dovetail Partners Inc., in its 2010 Forest Certification: A Status Report, states: "the previous differences between forest certification programs are much less distinct ... each program generally has the same structural programmatic requirements, although the required content and level of detail provided by each may vary considerably."

SFI is considered less stringent by some people than the Forest Stewardship Council (FSC). For example, SFI allows more tree farming and does not require conservation plans or consultation with local and indigenous stakeholders (except for public lands).

SFI was less highly rated than FSC for example by Consumer Reports “Greener Choices”, and Green America. Others rate SFI/PEFC and FSC equally: TerraChoice (part of Underwriters Laboratories Global Network) in its 2010 Sins of Greenwashing report, like its 2009 one, counts the SFI/PEFC and FSC in its second-tier list of "legitimate" environmental standards and certifications.; as does Environment Canada's EcoLogo.

A National Association of State Foresters forest certification policy statement passed by resolution in 2008 states: "While in different manners, the ATFS (American Tree Farm System), FSC (Forest Stewardship Council), and SFI systems include the fundamental elements of credibility and make positive contributions to forest sustainability. No certification program can credibly claim to be ‘best’, and no certification program that promotes itself as the only certification option can maintain credibility."

Green Building Council 
On April 5, 2016, the U.S. Green Building Council issued a Leadership in Energy and Environmental Design (LEED) pilot alternative compliance path (ACP) designed to screen out illegal forest products from LEED buildings. While the ACP is being tested as a credit, it will ultimately become a prerequisite that applies to all LEED projects. As a pilot, the ACP does not become a permanent part of the LEED standard without an affirmative vote of the USGBC membership.  The ACP pilot recognizes all certified sources – FSC, PEFC, SFI and ATFS and programs. The ACP will apply to all LEED v4 rating systems including Homes v4 and to all LEED 2009 rating systems.

The ACP categorizes the various forest certification standards based on the ASTM D7612-10 (2015) standard, which is titled “Categorizing Wood and Wood-Based Products According to Their Fiber Sources.” ASTM (American Society for Testing and Materials) International is a globally recognized leader in the development and delivery of voluntary consensus standards.

Other green building tools, including two American National Standards Institute (ANSI)-approved rating systems in the United States –  ANSI-ICC 700–2008: National Green Building Standard and ANSI/GBI 01-2010: Green Building Assessment Protocol for Commercial Buildings (formerly Green Globes U.S.) – Green Globes and Built Green Canada recognize wood products certified by credible third-party certification programs like SFI.

Conservation organizations 
SFI is supported by conservation groups such as the American Bird Conservancy, Ducks Unlimited Canada, Arbor Day Foundation, American Forests, and the Canadian Parks Council (all of which serve on the SFI Board).

Unlike SFI, the FSC included environmental groups such as Greenpeace among its founders. The National Wildlife Federation and World Wide Fund for Nature (WWF) currently serve on the FSC Board. The Sierra Club endorses only FSC.

Critiques of SFI

Marketing practices
On September 9, 2009 the Washington State Forest Law Center, on behalf of the environmental protection group ForestEthics, filed complaints against SFI Inc. with the Federal Trade Commission and the Internal Revenue Service.

The FTC complaint accused SFI Inc. of misleading consumers with deceptive marketing practices. The complaint cited various aspects of SFI's marketing, including its claim that it is an “independent” not-for-profit organization, its dependence on the timber industry for funding, and the vagueness of SFI's environmental standards, which allow SFI-certified landowners to be certified merely because the landowner is complying with state environmental regulations. The 2009 complaint cited SFI's certification as an example of greenwash.

Both the FTC and IRS investigated the complaints made against SFI and found them without merit. No action was taken by either investigative body.

Conflict of interest

The complaint filed with the IRS requested an examination of SFI Inc.’s non-profit status, based on the argument that SFI benefits the private interests of its corporate landowners and not the public interest, as well as the fact that SFI draws funding from the wood and paper industry. The complaint asserts that in serving the private interests of wood and paper companies that want a "green" image, SFI is inappropriately granted a nonprofit status reserved for public charities.

The IRS investigated the complaint as well as conducted a thorough examination of SFI's non-profit status and concluded that it was appropriate and that no further action was required.

Sierra Club complaint 

The Sierra Club lodged a formal complaint with SFI, alleging that Weyerhaeuser engaged in risky and irresponsible logging on steep slopes that led to 1,259 landslides in 2007 on SFI-certified Weyerhaeuser lands in Washington state. Challenging SFI to back up its claims of "independence" and "rigorous audits," the Sierra Club requested that Weyerhaeuser's SFI certification be revoked.

A peer reviewed landslide study concluded that the Washington State landslides that the Sierra Club attributed to Weyerhaeuser's logging practices were the result of extreme weather conditions such as heavy rainfall and not the result of steep slope logging by the company. Landslides occur on both logged and unlogged sites, but science shows that logging (and logging roads) dramatically increase the risk of landslides.

See also

 Certified wood
 Sustainable forest management

References

External links
 Sustainable Forestry Initiative, Inc.
 Programme for the Endorsement of Forest Certification
 Central Point of Expertise on Timber 2008 Forest Certification Assessment
 Conservation Fund President and CEO Larry Selzer, on forest certification

International forestry organizations
Sustainability organizations
Pulp and paper industry
Environmental issues with forests
Sustainable building
Forest certification